Once Upon a Time in China V is a 1994 Hong Kong–Chinese martial arts action film written and directed by Tsui Hark. The film is the fifth installment in the Once Upon a Time in China film series, with Vincent Zhao reprising his role as Chinese martial arts master and folk hero of Cantonese ethnicity Wong Fei-hung after taking over the character from Jet Li in Once Upon a Time in China IV. The film also saw the return of Hark as director (he only co-wrote and produced the fourth film) and of Rosamund Kwan as "13th Aunt", who was absent in the fourth film.

Plot
After the armies of the Eight-Nation Alliance occupy Beijing, the collapse of the Qing Dynasty is imminent. Wong Fei-hung and his companions return to Foshan in southern China and prepare to move to Hong Kong (then a British colony) in the meantime, Wong Fei-hung develops a love triangle with his romantic interests "13th Aunt" and "14th Aunt".

When they arrive at the port town, they see that the town is in a desolate state, as the authorities have fled with all the public funds, leaving the local army garrison without any money or food. The situation worsens with the presence of pirates, who terrorise the coast and seal off the sea route. Wong and his companions decide to form a local crime prevention force to deal with the threats, leading to three confrontations with the pirates and eventual victory for the protagonists. Wong and his family decide to settle in Hong Kong to help the local government maintain peace and security.

Cast
 Vincent Zhao as Wong Fei-hung
 Rosamund Kwan as "13th Aunt" Yee Siu-kwan
 Max Mok as Leung Foon
 Kent Cheng as Lam Sai-wing ("Porky Wing")
 Roger Kwok as So Sai-man ("Bucktooth" So)
 Hung Yan-yan as Kwai Geuk-chat ("Clubfoot Seven Chiu-Tsat")
 Jean Wang as "14th Aunt" May 
 Lau Shun as Wong Kei-ying
 Tam Bing-man as Boss
 Yee Tin-hung as Devil Cheung
 Elaine Lui as "Single-eyed" Ying
 Zhang Tielin as Chief constable Xie Sibao
 Stephen Tung as Junior Cheung
 Dion Lam as Flying Monkey
 Sam Hoh as pirate
 Lau Siu-ming as pirate
 James Wong
 Kong Foo-keung
 Tanigaki Kenji
 Lam Kwok-git
 Cheung Chun-hung
 Ho Chi-moo

Box office
Despite receiving more positive reviews than Once Upon a Time in China IV, the fifth in the series performed poorly at the Hong Kong box office, grossing only HK$4,902,426.

References

External links
 
 
 HKMDB
 HK Cinemagic

1994 films
1994 martial arts films
1990s biographical films
Hong Kong biographical films
Hong Kong martial arts films
Hong Kong sequel films
1990s Cantonese-language films
Kung fu films
Once Upon a Time in China (film series)
Films directed by Tsui Hark
Films set in the Qing dynasty
1990s Hong Kong films